Charles Neal Anderson (born August 14, 1964) is an American former professional football player who was a running back in the National Football League (NFL) for eight seasons during the 1980s and 1990s.  Anderson played college football for the University of Florida.  He was a first-round pick in the 1986 NFL Draft, and he played professionally for the Chicago Bears of the NFL.

Early years

Anderson was born in Graceville, Florida in 1964.  He attended Graceville High School, and played for the Graceville Tigers high school football team.

College career

Anderson accepted an athletic scholarship to attend the University of Florida in Gainesville, Florida, where he played for Charley Pell and Galen Hall's Florida Gators football teams from 1982 to 1985, and shared the Gators' backfield with fullback John L. Williams for four years.  Memorably, Anderson ran for 197 yards versus the Kentucky Wildcats as a freshman in 1982, a seventy-six-yard touchdown against the LSU Tigers in 1983, and 178 yards and an eighty-yard touchdown against the Tennessee Volunteers in 1984.  He was a team captain in 1985, a first-team All-Southeastern Conference (SEC) selection in 1985, an Associated Press honorable mention All-American in 1984 and 1985, and the recipient of the Gators' Fergie Ferguson Award in 1985.  In his four years as a Gator, Anderson had fourteen games with 100 yards or more rushing, 639 carries for 3,234 yards rushing and thirty touchdowns, forty-nine receptions for 525 yards receiving and two touchdowns, and ninety-seven yards passing.  In terms of career rushing yardage, he remains the Gators' third all-time running back behind Errict Rhett and Emmitt Smith.

Behind the rushing of Anderson, the rushing and receiving of John L. Williams, the receiving of wide receiver Ricky Nattiel and the passing of quarterback Kerwin Bell, the Gators finished with identical best-in-the-SEC records of 9–1–1 in 1984 and 1985.  Anderson graduated from Florida with a bachelor's degree in public relations in 1986, and was later inducted into the University of Florida Athletic Hall of Fame as a "Gator Great" in 1995.  The sportswriters of The Gainesville Sun selected him as No. 13 among the top 100 all-time greatest Gators from the first 100 years of Florida football in 2006.

Professional career

He joined the franchise as a rookie immediately following the Bears'  championship season. The Bears picked Anderson to back up, and eventually succeed, Walter Payton, who became the Bears and NFL's all-time rushing leader during his lengthy career.

Anderson's best years came during the late 1980s, where he rushed for over 1,000 yards in three consecutive seasons. In all three seasons, Anderson scored over ten touchdowns and averaged over four yards per carry.

Over his eight-year career, Anderson appeared in 116 regular season games, and started 91 of them; he amassed 6,166 yards and scored 51 touchdowns rushing, and 2,763 yards and 20 touchdowns receiving—a career total of 71 touchdowns.  Anderson's career was shortened by injuries and the Bears' fall-out during the early 1990s.  He is currently the Bears' third all-time franchise rusher, behind Payton and Matt Forté.

Anderson says his favorite memory from his NFL career was December 2, 1990, when he scored a 50 yard game-winning touchdown on a pass from Jim Harbaugh against the Detroit Lions, which eliminated them from the playoffs and secured an appearance by the Bears. "I caught a touchdown pass against Detroit at the end of the game. And that put us in the playoffs. One of the few things I remember was being under the pile and everybody jumping on top of me. All of the guys in the locker room called me 'The Cuz.' And I could just hear people saying: 'The Cuz! The Cuz!'"

NFL career statistics

Life after football

Anderson now lives with his wife and their three children in the Gainesville area, where he helped found a bank and owns a  peanut farm.  He is active in the community. He is a big fan of professional wrestling and attended Wrestlemania XI.

In 1998, Anderson helped found, and is now on the board of directors of, Community Bank and Trust of Florida, a bank with 11 locations in and near Gainesville.

See also

 Florida Gators football, 1980–89
 History of the Chicago Bears
 List of Chicago Bears first-round draft picks
 List of Chicago Bears players
 List of Florida Gators in the NFL Draft
 List of University of Florida alumni
 List of University of Florida Athletic Hall of Fame members

References

Bibliography
 Carlson, Norm, University of Florida Football Vault: The History of the Florida Gators, Whitman Publishing, LLC, Atlanta, Georgia (2007).  .
 Golenbock, Peter, Go Gators!  An Oral History of Florida's Pursuit of Gridiron Glory, Legends Publishing, LLC, St. Petersburg, Florida (2002).  .
 Hairston, Jack, Tales from the Gator Swamp: A Collection of the Greatest Gator Stories Ever Told, Sports Publishing, LLC, Champaign, Illinois (2002).  .
 McCarthy, Kevin M.,  Fightin' Gators: A History of University of Florida Football, Arcadia Publishing, Mount Pleasant, South Carolina (2000).  .
 Nash, Noel, ed., The Gainesville Sun Presents The Greatest Moments in Florida Gators Football, Sports Publishing, Inc., Champaign, Illinois (1998).  .

1964 births
Living people
American football running backs
Chicago Bears players
Florida Gators football players
National Conference Pro Bowl players
People from Jackson County, Florida
Brian Piccolo Award winners